Daniel Peretz (born 10 July 2000) is an Israeli professional footballer who plays as a goalkeeper for Israeli Premier League club Maccabi Tel Aviv and the Israel national team.

Early and personal life
Peretz was born in Tel Aviv-Yafo, Israel, to a family of both Sephardi Jewish and Mizrahi Jewish descent and of Ashkenazi Jewish (German-Jewish) descent. He is the cousin of fellow Maccabi Tel Aviv youth academy graduates Dan Glazer and younger twin-brothers Tamir Glazer and Amit Glazer.

He also holds a German passport, on account of his Ashkenazi Jewish (German-Jewish) ancestry, which eases the move to certain European football leagues.

Club career
Peretz joined the Maccabi Tel Aviv youth academy, at the age of six.

Beitar Tel Aviv Bat Yam (loan)
He spent his senior debut season on loan at Beitar Tel Aviv Bat Yam in the 2019–20 Liga Leumit, where he made 32 appearances and scored two goals.

Maccabi Tel Aviv
On 22 August 2020, Peretz made his debut with Maccabi Tel Aviv in the 2020–21 Toto Cup Al (for the Israeli Premier League) final 2–0 win against Bnei Sakhnin. On 12 September 2021, he signed a new contract with the club, until the end of the 2023–24 Israeli Premier League season.

Peretz has been Maccabi Tel Aviv's first goalkeeper choice during his European campaign debut in the 2021–22 UEFA Europa Conference League, helping his team to get from its initial second qualifying stage, to the third qualifying stage, then to its play-off round, and then to the final tournament's group stage where Maccabi Tel Aviv eventually qualified from the second place of it to the knockout round play-offs against Dutch side PSV Eindhoven that ended for his team in a 1–0 away loss and a 1–1 home draw.

On 18 August 2022, Peretz was praised for his performance that managed to keep a clean sheet in their 2022–23 UEFA Conference League Play-offs first leg against French side Nice, helping his team to a 1–0 home victory.

International career
Peretz has been a youth international for Israel since 2016, and he currently plays as the first goalkeeper for the Israel U-21 since his debut on 2 September 2021.

Peretz was first called up to the Israeli senior side on 4 October 2021, head of the 2022 FIFA World Cup qualifiers (UEFA) matches against Scotland and Moldova.

In the playoff for 2023 UEFA European Under-21 Championship against Ireland, the tie went to a penalty shootout. Peretz saved three penalties and scored one of his own to punch Israel's ticket to the tournament.

Career statistics

Club

International

Honours
Maccabi Tel Aviv
 Israel State Cup: 2020–21
 Israel Toto Cup (Ligat Ha'Al): 2020–21
 Israel Super Cup: 2020

See also 
 List of Jewish footballers
 List of Jews in sports
 List of Israelis

References

External links
 

2000 births
Living people
Footballers from Tel Aviv
Israeli people of German-Jewish descent
Citizens of Germany through descent
Israeli Ashkenazi Jews
Israeli Sephardi Jews
Israeli Mizrahi Jews
21st-century German Jews
German Ashkenazi Jews
German Sephardi Jews
Jewish footballers
Israeli footballers
German footballers
Israel international footballers
Israel under-21 international footballers
Israel youth international footballers
Association football goalkeepers
Maccabi Tel Aviv F.C. players
Beitar Tel Aviv Bat Yam F.C. players
Israeli Premier League players
Liga Leumit players